Gelimer (original form possibly Geilamir, 480–553), King of the Vandals and Alans (530–534), was the last Germanic ruler of the North African Kingdom of the Vandals. He became ruler on 15 June 530 after deposing his first cousin twice removed, Hilderic, who had angered the Vandal nobility by converting to Chalcedonian Christianity, as most of the Vandals at this time were fiercely devoted to Arian Christianity.

The Eastern Roman Emperor Justinian I, who had supported Hilderic, soon declared war on the Vandals, ostensibly to restore Hilderic. In June 533, Justinian sent an expeditionary force commanded by Belisarius which finally reached Africa in the beginning of September. Meanwhile, in Sardinia, which formed part of the Vandal domain, the governor Godas, a Goth, revolted against Gelimer and began to treat with Justinian as an independent sovereign. Gelimer, ignorant or contemptuous of Justinian's plans, sent a large army consisting of most of the available army in Africa under his brother Tzazo to crush the rebellion, meaning that the landing of Belisarius was entirely unopposed. 

On landing, Belisarius immediately marched for Carthage, finally meeting resistance on 13 September when he was confronted by Gelimer at Ad Decimum, 10 miles from Carthage. Although outnumbered 11,000 to 17,000 the battle was evenly fought by the Vandals until Gelimer's brother Ammatus was killed, at which time Gelimer lost heart and fled. On 14 September 533, Belisarius entered Carthage and ate the feast prepared for Gelimer in his palace. However, Belisarius was too late to save the life of Hilderic, who had been slain at Gelimer's orders as soon as the news of the landing of the imperial army came.

However, Gelimer had escaped the Roman pursuit, and on the return of Tzazo from Sardinia the combined Vandal army met Belisarius in battle, this time at a place called Tricamarum about 20 miles from Carthage (December 533). This battle was far more stubbornly contested than that of Ad Decimum, but it ended in the utter rout of the Vandals and, once more, the flight of Gelimer. He retreated to Mons Pappua (maybe in the Mount Edough, near Annaba) on the border of Numidia, where he soon found himself besieged by Byzantine forces under Pharas. According to Procopius, when summoned to surrender Gelimer instead asked Pharas to send him a loaf of bread, a sponge, and a lyre, to make the winter months on Pappua more bearable.  

Finally, in March 534, with his followers and their children starving and realizing he had no chance of regaining his kingdom, Gelimer surrendered to Belisarius and accepted the Romans' offer of vast estates in Galatia where he lived to be an old man. According to Procopius, on his abdication he achieved some degree of anecdotal fame by crying out the verse from Ecclesiastes1:2, 'Vanity of vanities, all is vanity' during Belisarius's triumph in Constantinople.

Notes

Sources
Hodgkin, Thomas. Italy and her Invaders. Clarendon Press: 1895.

480 births
553 deaths
Kings of the Vandals
Vandal warriors
6th-century monarchs in Africa
5th-century Arian Christians
6th-century Arian Christians
Prisoners of war held by the Byzantine Empire
Vandalic War